Julio Silva Solar (8 June 1926 – 28 June 2014) was a Chilean politician and lawyer. Solar served as a member of the Chamber of Deputies of Chile from 1965 to 1973. He then served as President of the Chamber of Deputies of Chile from 9 September 1969 to 16 September 1969.

Solar died in Santiago, Chile from a heart attack, aged 88.

References

External links
 Julio Silva Solar interview

1926 births
2014 deaths
People from Viña del Mar
National Falange politicians
Christian Democratic Party (Chile) politicians
Popular Unitary Action Movement politicians
Christian Left (Chile) politicians
Party for Democracy (Chile) politicians
Presidents of the Chamber of Deputies of Chile
Deputies of the XLV Legislative Period of the National Congress of Chile
Deputies of the XLVI Legislative Period of the National Congress of Chile
20th-century Chilean lawyers